German submarine U-161 was a Type IXC U-boat of Nazi Germany's Kriegsmarine built for service during World War II. The keel for this boat was laid down on 23 March 1940 at the Deutsche Schiff und maschinenbau AG, Bremen yard as yard number 700. She was launched on 1 March 1941 and commissioned on 8 July under the command of Kapitänleutnant Hans-Ludwig Witt (Knight's Cross).

The U-boat's service began with training as part of the 4th U-boat Flotilla. She then moved to the 10th flotilla on 1 January 1942 for operations. She sank 12 ships, totalling ; one warship of 1,130 tons and damaged five others, for 35,672 GRT. She also damaged one warship (5,450 tons) and caused one merchant vessel to be declared a total loss (3,305 GRT).

She was sunk by an American aircraft on 27 September 1943.

Design
German Type IXC submarines were slightly larger than the original Type IXBs. U-161 had a displacement of  when at the surface and  while submerged. She had two shafts and two  propellers.

U-161 was fitted with six  torpedo tubes (four fitted at the bow and two at the stern), 22 torpedoes, one  SK C/32 naval gun, 180 rounds, and a  SK C/30 as well as a  C/30 anti-aircraft gun. The boat had a complement of forty-eight.

Service history

First and second patrols
The submarine's first patrol took her from Kiel on 3 January 1942, across the North Sea and into the Atlantic Ocean through the gap between the Faroe and Shetland Islands. She arrived at Lorient, in occupied France, on 3 May. She would be based at this Atlantic port for the rest of her career.

U-161s second sortie proved to be successful, damaging British Consul and Mokihana on 19 February 1942 while the ships rode at anchor in the Gulf of Paria off Port of Spain, Trinidad. She went on to sink ships such as Circe Shell, Lihue the petrol tanker Uniwaleco off St Vincent.

One ship sunk by U-161, Sarniadoc, sank in 30 seconds after her boiler exploded. There were no survivors. On 15 March 1942, while en route alone from Curaçao, Netherlands West Indies to Antigua, British West Indies, the Speedwell-class , (formerly the U.S. Army mine planter General John P. Story transferred to the United States Lighthouse Service at no cost in 1922,) was sunk by gunfire from U-161 approximately 150 miles south of Port-au-Prince, Haiti. The entire crew of Acacia abandoned ship before she sank and all were rescued unscathed. She was the only U.S. tender sunk by enemy action during the war in the Caribbean.

Third patrol
The boat's third patrol took her past the Azores and Cape Verde Islands, to the Brazilian coast north of Fortaleza. She then followed that coastline north until she reached the Caribbean. On 16 June 1942 she stopped the sailing ship Neuva Altagracia with gunfire and sank the vessel with scuttling charges. She also attacked San Pablo while the ship was being unloaded in Puerto Limón, Costa Rica on 3 July. Although the ship sank, she was raised with the intention of repair; but she was declared a total loss and sunk as a target on 25 September.

She crossed the Atlantic in an easterly direction, but turned about and returned to the Caribbean. The boat returned to Lorient on 7 August.

Fourth patrol
Her fourth foray was to west Africa. This patrol was her longest-113 days.

Fifth patrol
The boat's fifth patrol involved another Atlantic crossing and sinking a second sailing ship, Angelus, north of Bermuda, again with gunfire. Ten survivors abandoned the vessel; only two were still alive when their lifeboat was discovered.

Sixth patrol and loss

The U-boat departed Lorient for the last time on 8 August 1943.  She rendezvoused with the Japanese submarine I-8 on 20 August to transfer two radio technicians and a Metox radar detector for installation on the Japanese submarine. Returning to the Brazilian coast, she sank St. Usk on 20 September and Itapagé on the 26th. She was sunk with all hands (53 men), on 27 September 1943 by an American PBM Mariner aircraft of VP-74 in the South Atlantic.

Summary of raiding history

References

Notes

Citations

Bibliography

External links

German Type IX submarines
U-boats commissioned in 1941
U-boats sunk in 1943
World War II submarines of Germany
World War II shipwrecks in the Atlantic Ocean
World War II shipwrecks in the South Atlantic
1941 ships
Ships built in Bremen (state)
U-boats sunk by US aircraft
U-boats sunk by depth charges
Ships lost with all hands
Maritime incidents in September 1943